Corno, italian for Natural horn
 Irene Camber-Corno, Italian fencer
 Corno (artist), Canadian artist
 Cornicello, Italian amulet
 Corno, small river of the northern Lazio and eastern Umbria in Italy
 Corno di Rosazzo, municipality in the Province of Udine in the Italian region Friuli-Venezia Giulia
 Corno Giovine, municipality in the Province of Lodi in the Italian region Lombardy

See also 

 Corn (disambiguation)
 Corna (disambiguation)
 Corne (disambiguation)
 Corni (disambiguation)